The Two-Handed TransAtlantic Race (TwoSTAR) is a yacht race first held in 1981.  It is held approximately every four years with the last event in 2017. The next race is announced for 2020.

See also
 Single-Handed Trans-Atlantic Race

References

Transatlantic sailing competitions
Yachting races